Sulev Oll (born March 17, 1964) is an Estonian journalist, sports historian and poet. He has worked for Postimees, a major Estonian newspaper. and is mentioned in the Estonian national biography. As a journalist and writer he is noted for his expertise in Estonian athletic history.

Biography
Oll was born in the small borough of Aseri in Lääne-Viru County. He graduated from Aseri high school in 1982. He excelled in chemistry, mathematics and history and sports. 
Between 1982-1987 he studied history at Tartu State University, graduating  in history and social studies  with a thesis on the "Athletes of the Republic of Estonia, the country challenge in the years 1920-1940". He studied journalism at the University of Tartu in 1989-1993 with a thesis on "Development of Thought and the farm reflected in the Estonian agricultural journalism from 1987-1993."

Oll has worked as a reporter and senior editor  for Postimees.  He has published books and made contributions to books about Estonian athletics on the 2004 Summer Olympics in Athens and the 2006 Winter Olympics in Turin.  In the late 2000s he has developed as a poet.

Selected works
Hea Tuju Kuju (2008)
Aeg Annab Kõik (2008)
Öö Mõte On Kuus (2008) (with Anti Kuus)
Vana Sõna Vallatused (2010)Printessi Voodikohendaja Päevaraamat (2010)

References

External links
Maaleht

1964 births
Living people
People from Viru-Nigula Parish
Estonian journalists
Estonian male poets
21st-century Estonian historians
Sports historians
21st-century Estonian poets
University of Tartu alumni